Gottschall is a German surname meaning "God's echo". Notable people with the surname include:

 Elaine Gottschall (1921–2005), American proponent of the specific carbohydrate diet
 Joan B. Gottschall (born 1947), United States federal judge
 Jonathan Gottschall, American literary scholar
 Rudolf von Gottschall (1823–1909), German poet and dramatist
 Hermann von Gottschall (1862-1933), German chess master, son of Rudolf
 Zsófia Gottschall (born 1978), Hungarian biathlete and skier

See also
Gottschalk

German-language surnames